Daniel Simmons may refer to:
Dan Simmons, novelist
Chief Yowlachie, Yakima Indian actor born Daniel Simmons
Daniel ‘Danny’ Simmons Jr, poet and illustrator
Daniel 'Diggy' Simmons III, hip-hop singer (b. 1995)
Daniel A. Simmons, author of self-psychology texts
Daniel L. Simmons, chemist at Brigham Young University
Daniel Simmons, murder victim in the Charleston church shooting